Lisa Dawn Stockton (born April 1, 1964) is the current women's basketball head coach at Tulane University, born in Greensboro, North Carolina. She was named the Green Wave's 6th head basketball coach in 1994.  As the winningest coach in Conference USA, she was named 2006-07 C-USA Coach of the Year, a distinction she again earned for the 2009–10 season.

High school career
At Western Guilford High School, where Stockton graduated in 1982, she was all-conference four times and conference player of the year her senior year.

College career
At Wake Forest University, Stockton played women's basketball from 1983 to 1986. She scored 1,347 career points, ranking ninth on the program's all-time list. She led her team in assists the first two seasons. As a senior she scored 204 field goals, ranking eighth.

After college
Though drafted by the National Women's Basketball Association, Stockton chose to coach instead, starting her career at Greensboro College.

Head coaching record

References

External links
 Tulane profile

1964 births
Living people
American women's basketball coaches
Basketball coaches from North Carolina
North Carolina Tar Heels women's basketball coaches
Sportspeople from Greensboro, North Carolina
Tulane Green Wave women's basketball coaches
Wake Forest Demon Deacons women's basketball players
Basketball players from Greensboro, North Carolina